Events from the year 1949 in the United Kingdom.

Incumbents
 Monarch – George VI
 Prime Minister – Clement Attlee (Labour)
 Parliament – 38th

Events
 January – Mass Observation carries out a national survey into the sexual behaviour and attitudes of 4,000 British people, "Little Kinsey". The results remain largely unpublished for over fifty years.
 1 January
 Peacetime conscription in the United Kingdom is regularised under the National Service Act 1947. Men aged 18–26 in England, Scotland and Wales are obliged to serve full-time in the armed forces for 18 months.
 The British Nationality Act 1948 comes into effect, creating the status of "Citizen of the United Kingdom and Colonies", superseding the shared status of "Commonwealth citizen".
 4 January –  of the Cunard Line departs Southampton for New York on her maiden voyage.
 28 January – Lynskey tribunal on corruption in public life reports, leading to the resignation of John Belcher as an MP.
 31 January – Book at Bedtime debuts on the BBC Light Programme.
 1 February – Women's Auxiliary Air Force renamed as the Women's Royal Air Force.
 15 March – post-war rationing of clothes ends.
 25 March – Laurence Olivier's film Hamlet (1948) becomes the first British film to win a 'Best Picture' Oscar.
 28 March – astronomer Fred Hoyle coins the term Big Bang during a BBC Third Programme radio broadcast.
 1 April – the Marquess of Bath opens Longleat House to paying visitors, the first privately owned stately home to be so opened.
 4 April – Britain signs the North Atlantic Treaty, creating NATO.
 12 April – first women appointed King's Counsel in England: Rose Heilbron and Helena Normanton.
 20 April
 Royal Navy frigate HMS Amethyst goes up the Yangtze River to evacuate British Commonwealth refugees escaping the advance of the Mao's communist forces. Under heavy fire, it runs aground off Rose Island. After an aborted rescue attempt on 26 April, it anchors 10 miles upstream. Negotiations with the communist forces to let the ship leave drag on for weeks, during which time its cat, Simon, raises the crew's morale.
 The first Badminton Horse Trials are held at Badminton House in Gloucestershire.
 24 April – wartime rationing of sweets and chocolate ends, but is re-instituted shortly thereafter as shortages return.
 26 April – Ealing comedy film Passport to Pimlico is premièred in London.
 28 April – the 1949 Commonwealth Prime Ministers' Conference issues the London Declaration, enabling India (and, thereafter, any other nation) to remain in the Commonwealth despite becoming a republic, creating the position of 'Head of the Commonwealth' (held by the ruling British monarch), and renaming the organisation from 'British Commonwealth' to 'Commonwealth of Nations'.
 29 April – the News Review reveals that neither the English public school Selhurst College nor its headmaster H. Rochester Sneath exist, but are a hoax created by Humphry Berkeley the previous year.
 30 April – 1949 FA Cup Final: Wolverhampton Wanderers F.C. win the FA Cup for the first time in 41 years, and the third time in their history, with a 3–1 win over Leicester City at Wembley Stadium.
 April – Manchester Mark 1 computer operable at the University of Manchester.
 May – Council for Wales and Monmouthshire, set up as a government advisory body, first meets.
 1 May – the gas industry is nationalised.
 3 May – Parliament passes the Ireland Act guaranteeing the position of Northern Ireland as part of the United Kingdom as long as a majority of its citizens want it to be. The government also recognises the existence of the Republic of Ireland.
 6 May – EDSAC, the first practicable stored-program computer, runs its first program at Cambridge University.
 10 May – first self-service launderette opens, in Queensway (London).
 11 May – Christopher Fry's verse drama The Lady's Not for Burning premieres in London.
 7–25 June – dock strike forces the government to use troops to unload goods.
 8 June – George Orwell's dystopian novel Nineteen Eighty-Four is published in London by Secker & Warburg.
 16 June – Ealing comedy film Whisky Galore! released.
 21 June – Ealing comedy film Kind Hearts and Coronets released.
 27 July – maiden flight of the British-built de Havilland Comet, the world's first passenger jet, at Hatfield, Hertfordshire.
 30 July – Legal Aid and Advice Act establishes a much-extended system of Legal aid in England and Wales (with the Legal Aid and Solicitors (Scotland) Act applying similarly in Scotland).
 31 July – Captain Kerans of HMS Amethyst decides to make a break after nightfall under heavy fire from the Chinese People's Liberation Army both sides of the Yangtze River and successfully rejoins the fleet at Woosung the next day.
 22 August – T. S. Eliot's comedy The Cocktail Party premieres at the Edinburgh Festival.
 24 August – Old Trafford football stadium, home of Manchester United F.C., is re-opened following a comprehensive rebuild due to bomb damage by the Luftwaffe eight years earlier.
 2 September – film The Third Man, with screenplay by Graham Greene, released. The film wins the 1949 Grand Prix at the Cannes Film Festival.
 19 September – the pound devalued by 30% against the United States dollar.
 21 September – the first comprehensive school in Wales is opened in Holyhead, Anglesey.
 30 September – the Berlin Airlift comes to an end, during which 17 American and 7 British planes have crashed delivering supplies to Soviet blockaded Berlin.
 October – Valerie Hunter Gordon is granted a U.K. patent for the disposable nappy.
 12 October – John Boyd Orr, 1st Baron Boyd-Orr wins the Nobel Peace Prize.
 26 October – How Do You View?, the first comedy series on British television, starring Terry-Thomas, is first broadcast on BBC Television.
 4 November – Cwmbran designated as the first New Town in Wales under powers of the New Towns Act 1946.
 28 November – Conservative Party leader Winston Churchill makes a landmark speech in support of the idea of a European Union at Kingsway Hall, London, but without commitment to early U.K. membership.
 16 December – Parliament Act given royal assent; cuts the House of Lords veto to one year.
 17 December – Sutton Coldfield transmitting station begins transmitting BBC Television to the English Midlands, the first broadcasts to be seen outside the London area.

Undated
 The number of workforce deaths in the coal industry is reported to have fallen to a record low since nationalisation two years ago.

Publications
 Enid Blyton's children's books Little Noddy Goes to Toyland, the first to introduce the title character; and The Secret Seven, first in the eponymous series.
 Agatha Christie's novel Crooked House.
 H. F. Ellis' humorous collection The Papers of A.J. Wentworth B.A.
 Graham Greene's novella The Third Man.
 Nancy Mitford's novel Love in a Cold Climate.
 George Orwell's novel Nineteen Eighty-Four.

Births
 7 January – Brian Haw, protester and peace campaigner (died 2011)
 17 January – Mick Taylor, rock guitarist
 19 January 
 Robert Palmer, singer (died 2003)
 Andrew Samuels, psychologist and academic
 Dennis Taylor, snooker player
 23 January – Joan Walley, politician
 25 January – Paul Nurse, biologist and Nobel Prize winner
 29 January – Andy Carter, middle-distance runner
 4 February – Richard Ryder, Baron Ryder of Wensum, broadcaster and politician, Paymaster General
 16 February – Lyn Paul, pop singer
 18 February – Charlie Waite, landscape photographer
 2 March – J. P. R. Williams, Welsh rugby player
 6 March – Martin Buchan, footballer
 9 March – Neil Hamilton, Conservative MP, later UKIP politician and Welsh Assembly Member 2016–2021.
 17 March – Alex Higgins, snooker player (died 2010)
 28 March – Kevin Lloyd, actor (died 1998)
 3 April – Richard Thompson, rock guitarist and songwriter
 8 April – Alex Fergusson, Presiding Officer of the Scottish Parliament 2007–2011 (died 2018)
 24 April – James Paice, farmer and politician
 25 April – James Fenton, poet
 29 April – Anita Dobson, actress
 2 May – Alan Titchmarsh, gardener and television presenter
 4 May – Lindsey Hughes, historian (died 2007)
 13 May – Zoë Wanamaker, actress (born in New York)
 18 May – Rick Wakeman, rock keyboard player and songwriter (Yes)
 21 May – Andrew Neil, Scottish journalist and broadcaster
 24 May – Jim Broadbent, actor
 26 May – Jeremy Corbyn, Leader of the Labour Party (2015-2020)
 29 May – Francis Rossi, rock musician (lead singer, Status Quo)
 30 May – Bob Willis, cricketer (fast bowler) (died 2019)
 2 June –  Heather Couper, astronomer (died 2020)
 13 June – Red Symons, English-born Australian musician and television personality
 14 June 
 Jim Lea, rock musician (Slade)
 Alan White, drummer (Yes) (died 2022)
 21 June – John Agard, writer
 22 June – Brian Leveson, judge
 5 July – Sue Robbie, television presenter
 7 July – Bob Stewart, colonel and politician
 13 July – Richard Caddel, poet (died 2003)
 15 July – Trevor Horn, pop singer and producer
 22 July – Geoffrey Durham, entertainer
 26 July – Roger Taylor, rock drummer (Queen)
 28 July
 Simon Kirke, drummer 
 Steve Peregrin Took, singer-songwriter and guitarist (died 1980)
 6 August – Alan Campbell, clergyman
 12 August – Mark Knopfler, rock guitarist and singer-songwriter (Dire Straits)
 15 August 
Richard Deacon, sculptor
Edward McMillan-Scott, lawyer and politician
 21 August – Rosemary Lenton, para-bowler and wheelchair curler
 25 August
 Martin Amis, novelist
 Ross Davidson, actor (died 2006)
 9 September
 John Curry, figure skater (died 1994)
 Jolyon Brettingham Smith, composer and radio presenter (died 2008)
 10 September – Freddy Marks, actor and musician (died 2021)
 13 September – Linda Colley, historian
 18 September
 Mo Mowlam, Labour politician, Secretary of State for Northern Ireland (died 2005)
 Peter Shilton, footballer
 19 September – Twiggy, born Lesley Hornby, model
 23 September – John Connaughton, footballer (died 2022)
 20 October – Jane Tucker, actress and musician
 30 October – Arabella Churchill, charity founder (died 2007)
 1 November – Gerald Ratner, businessman
 6 November – Nigel Havers, actor
 7 November – Gerald Ashby, football referee (died 2001)
 24 November
 Nick Ainger, Labour politician
 Sally Davies, Chief Medical Officer
 27 November – Brumas, polar bear (first born at London Zoo)
 4 December – Paul Dickenson, hammer thrower
 6 December 
 Janet Anderson, politician (died 2023)
 Peter Willey, cricketer
 12 December 
 Chris Baillieu, rower and lawyer
 Bill Nighy, actor
 13 December – Robert Lindsay, actor
 16 December 
 Heather Hallett, Baroness Hallett, judge
 Stephanie Lawrence, singer and actress (died 2000) 
 17 December – Paul Rodgers, rock singer (Free)
 21 December – Nicholas Penny, art historian and academic
 Michael Houghton, virologist and Nobel Prize winner

Deaths
 2 January – Jock McNab, footballer (born 1894)
 9 January – Tommy Handley, radio comedian (born 1892)
 21 January 
 William Price Drury, novelist, playwright and Royal Marines officer (born 1861)
 J. H. Thomas, Welsh-born trade unionist and politician (born 1874)
 22 January – Henry Mond, 2nd Baron Melchett, industrialist and politician (born 1898)
 10 February – Charles Vane-Tempest-Stewart, 7th Marquess of Londonderry, politician (born 1878)
 19 March – Sir James Somerville, admiral (born 1882)
 2 April – George Graves, comic actor (born 1876)
 6 April – Sir Seymour Hicks, actor (born 1871)
 14 April – Reginald Hine, local historian and solicitor, suicide (born 1883)
 18 April – Will Hay, comic actor (born 1888)
 28 April
 Sir Robert Robertson, chemist (born 1869)
 Sir Fabian Ware, founder of the Imperial War Graves Commission (born 1869)
 21 June – Edward Wadsworth, Vorticist painter (born 1889)
 9 July – Fritz Hart, composer (born 1874)
 15 July – Eva Hubback, feminist (born 1886)
 25 July – Lilian Bowes Lyon, poet (born 1895)
 31 July – Alfred Bashford, cricketer (born 1881)
 9 August – G. E. M. Skues, inventor of nymph fly fishing (born 1858)
 16 August – Tom Wintringham, soldier and politician (born 1898)
 30 August – Arthur Fielder, cricketer (born 1877)
 9 September – Fredegond Shove, poet (born 1889)
 23 October – J. R. Clynes, trade unionist and Labour leader (born 1869)
 24 October – Thomas Rowland Hughes, writer (born 1903)
 30 October – Denis Eden, painter (born 1878)
 27 November – Tom Walls, actor and director (born 1883)
 30 November – Dame Irene Vanbrugh, actress (born 1872)
 5 December – Arthur Bedford, navy officer (born 1881)
 13 December – John Hope, Liberal politician (born 1860)
 16 December – George Maitland Lloyd Davies, pacifist politician (born 1880)
 24 December – Gertrude Bacon, aeronautical pioneer (born 1874)

See also
 List of British films of 1949

References

 
Years of the 20th century in the United Kingdom